Saint Mary's Basilica is a Brick Gothic church adjacent to the Main Market Square in Kraków, Poland. Built in the 14th century, its foundations date back to the early 13th century and serve as one of the best examples of Polish Gothic architecture. Standing 80 m (262 ft) tall, it is particularly famous for its wooden altarpiece carved by Veit Stoss (Wit Stwosz). Some of its monumental polychrome murals were designed by Poland's leading history painter, Jan Matejko (1898-1891). In 1978 it became a UNESCO World Heritage Site alongside the Historic Centre of Kraków.

On every hour, 24 hours a day, 365 days a year, a trumpet signal—called the Hejnał mariacki—is played from the top of the taller of Saint Mary's two towers. The plaintive tune breaks off in mid-stream, to commemorate a famous 13th century trumpeter who was shot in the throat while sounding the alarm before a Mongol attack on the city. The noon-time hejnał is heard across Poland and abroad broadcast live by the Polish national Radio 1 Station.

Saint Mary's Basilica also served as an architectural model for many of the churches that were built by the Polish diaspora abroad, particularly those like Saint Michael's and Saint John Cantius in Chicago, designed in the Polish Cathedral style.

The church is familiar to many English-speaking readers from the 1929 book The Trumpeter of Krakow by Eric P. Kelly.

History 
The building was destroyed during the Mongol invasion of Poland. Between 1290 and 1300 the new early Gothic church was built on the remaining foundations. It was consecrated twenty years later, in 1320.

The church was completely rebuilt during the reign of Casimir III the Great between 1355 and 1365 with substantial contributions from wealthy restaurateur Mikołaj Wierzynek. The presbytery was elongated and tall windows added. The main body of the church was completed in 1395–97 with the new vault constructed by master Nicholas Wernher from Prague. However, the vault over the presbytery collapsed in 1442 due to a possible earthquake, which has never happened before nor since in Kraków.

In the first half of the 15th century, the side chapels were added. Most of them were the work of master Franciszek Wiechoń. At the same time the northern tower was raised and designed to serve as the watch tower for the entire city. In 1478 carpenter Maciej Heringh (or Heringk) funded a helmet for the tower. A gilded crown was placed on it in 1666, which is still present today. At the end of the 15th century, Saint Mary's church was enriched with a sculptural masterpiece, an Altarpiece of Veit Stoss (Ołtarz Mariacki Wita Stwosza) of late Gothic design.

In 1536/37, King Sigismund I. declared that the sermons in the church should be changed from German to Polish. The large German community of Kraków were relocating their place of worship to the smaller Saint Barbara's church.

In the 18th century, by the decision of vicar Jacek Augustyn Łopacki, the interior was rebuilt in the late Baroque style. The author of this work was Francesco Placidi. All 26 altars, equipment, furniture, benches and paintings were replaced and the walls were decorated with polychrome, the work of Andrzej Radwański. In the years immediately before 1730 the Venetian painter Giambattista Pittoni painted five altarpieces for the side altars of the central nave: The Annunciation, The Adoration of the Magi, Madonna and Child with St. Philip Neri, Mary Magdalene, St. Sebastian.

At the beginning of the 19th century, the city decided that a cemetery near the basilica was to be shut down and replaced by a public square. Today, it is known as Plac Mariacki (Marian Square). In the years 1887–1891, under the direction of Tadeusz Stryjeński, the neo-Gothic design was introduced into the basilica. The temple gained a new design and murals painted and funded by Jan Matejko, who worked with Stanisław Wyspiański and Józef Mehoffer - the authors of stained glass in the presbytery.

Since the beginning of 1990s, the basilica underwent an extensive renovation. In 2003, in the final stage of the works, the roof of the church was replaced.

On 18 April 2010, in Saint Mary's Basilica, a funeral ceremony for Polish president Lech Kaczyński and his wife Maria was held. The coffins were later transported and buried in one of the crypts of Wawel Cathedral.

Gallery

See also 
 Ołtarz Wita Stwosza (Altarpiece of Veit Stoss)
 Jan Matejko 19th century design contribution
 Polish Cathedral style
 Roman Catholicism in Poland
 Roman Catholic Marian churches

Notes and references

External links 

 official website
 360° virtual tour of St Mary's church at night in Krakow
 Krakow: everything about St. Mary's Church
 Marek Strzala, Kosciol Mariacki - the basilica of the Virgin Mary in Krakow

Buildings and structures completed in 1347
Mary
Brick Gothic
Mariacka
Gothic architecture in Poland
Terminating vistas
14th-century Roman Catholic church buildings in Poland